3,4-Methylenedioxy-N-isopropylamphetamine (MDIP, MDIPA) is a psychoactive drug of the phenethylamine and amphetamine chemical classes which acts as an entactogen, psychedelic, and stimulant. It is the N-isopropyl analogue of 3,4-methylenedioxyamphetamine (MDA). MDIP was first synthesized by Alexander Shulgin. In his book PiHKAL, the minimum dosage is listed as 250 mg. MDIP produces a mild threshold. Very little is known about the pharmacology, pharmacokinetics, effects, and toxicity of MDIP.

References

Substituted amphetamines
Benzodioxoles